Potain may refer to:

Companies
 Potain (company): French tower cranes company bought in 2001 by Manitowoc Cranes.

People 
 Faustin Potain (1898-1968): French industrial who found Potain (company).
 Nicolas Marie Potain (1723-1790): French architect.
 Pierre Potain (1825-1901): French cardiologist.

Surnames of French origin
French-language surnames